Li Fengfeng (born January 18, 1979) is a Chinese shot putter. Her personal best throw is 19.13 metres, achieved in October 2006 in Changsha.

Li won the silver medal at the 2003 Asian Championships and the gold medal at the 2003 Summer Universiade. She also competed at the 2004 World Indoor Championships and the 2004 Olympic Games without reaching the final.

Achievements

References

1979 births
Living people
Athletes (track and field) at the 2004 Summer Olympics
Chinese female shot putters
Olympic athletes of China
Universiade medalists in athletics (track and field)
Universiade gold medalists for China
Medalists at the 2003 Summer Universiade
21st-century Chinese women